Bear Tavern is an unincorporated community located within Hopewell Township in Mercer County, New Jersey, United States.

The settlement is named for a historic tavern once located there.  During the American Revolutionary War, troops led by George Washington crossed the Delaware River at a location west of the settlement, then "trekked inland to the Bear Tavern and turned right, heading southeast toward Trenton".

The settlement is today located at the corner of Washington Crossing Pennington Road and Bear Tavern Road.  Washington Crossing State Park is located immediately to the northwest. Bear Tavern Elementary School is located south of the settlement.

References

Hopewell Township, Mercer County, New Jersey
New Jersey in the American Revolution
Unincorporated communities in Mercer County, New Jersey
Unincorporated communities in New Jersey